The Devil Made Me Do It is the debut studio album by American rapper Paris. It was released on October 9, 1990, on Tommy Boy Records. Paris toured the US and Europe that year to promote the record. The album eventually sold over 300,000 copies according to the emcee.

Release
The title track was banned on MTV. Some record stores refused to carry a version of the album, due to a cover image of a police officer putting a Black boy in a chokehold.

Critical reception

"Menacing...the vocals intensify and get hyper, creating a heightened sense of anxiety...his lyrics are intense and he drops science while showing skills on the mic..."
- The Source

"Rap music reaches new heights of political invective on Paris' jolting debut recording...Paris boosts his message with unique, sleek music...adding a primal beast-on-the-hunt quality..."
- People

"Hard-hitting beats combined with razor-sharp lyrics...Listen to the rhymes flow, and you'll realize that Paris is a massive, militant talent..."
- Hip Hop Connection

"Paris motivates with an authoritative voice that speaks to the underground rather than trying to pacify the masses."
- CMJ

"Easily the outstanding rap debut of 1990...a case study in how it should be done...this album profoundly understands the musical strategies of dissonance, atmosphere, space...Paris possesses one of those menacing voices that draws you into its husky world, via a timbre that carries the meaning within itself. In rap, the message is in the medium, and the medium is in the grain of the voice."
- Express

"More than just a rap album - it's a revolutionary handbook. Music for those who want mental stimulation with their dope beats."
- Urb

"An impressive debut with street smart, political, well-done raps...a strong, strong record."
- Billboard

"Paris is a force of gravity under which perpetrators melt of embarrassment...his musical genius is rhyme...Paris is a gun to your head, so listen up."
- Vox

Trouser Press praised the "diverse, imaginative and burningly intense self-produced tracks."

Track listing 
 "Intro" – 0:40
 "Scarface Groove" – 4:35
 "This Is a Test" – 2:47
 "Panther Power" – 3:58
 "Break the Grip of Shame" 3:34
 "Warning" – 1:07
 "Ebony" – 3:56
 "Brutal" – 3:53
 "On the Prowl" – 1:10
 "The Devil Made Me Do It" – 4:12
 "The Hate That Hate Made" – 1:09
 "Mellow Madness" – 4:50
 "I Call Him Mad" – 4:17
 "Escape from Babylon" – 5:18
 "Wretched" – 3:32
 "Break the Grip of Shame (The Final Call)" (Bonus track) – 8:06
 "Devil Made Me Do It (Poach a Pig Mix)" (Bonus track) – 5:44

Samples
Break the Grip of Shame
"Hot Pants (Bonus Beats)" by Bobby Byrd
Brutal
"Uphill Peace of Mind" by Kid Dynamite
Panther Power
"Timebomb" by Public Enemy
Scarface Groove
"Synthetic Substitution" by Melvin Bliss
The Devil Made Me Do It
"Funky Drummer" by James Brown
"Hihache" by Lafayette Afro Rock Band
Warning
"Chicken Yellow" by Miami
I Call Him Mad
"Funky Drummer" by James Brown
Ebony
"Boogie Nights" by Heatwave
Mellow Madness
"Siempre Hay Esperanza" by Sade

Charts

Weekly charts

Singles

References

External links
 

Paris (rapper) albums
1990 albums
Tommy Boy Records albums
Political music albums by American artists
Race-related controversies in music